Dani Niederberger (born 22 July 1973) is a Swiss biathlete. He competed in the men's relay event at the 2002 Winter Olympics.

References

1973 births
Living people
Swiss male biathletes
Olympic biathletes of Switzerland
Biathletes at the 2002 Winter Olympics
Sportspeople from Nidwalden